Ondřej Voříšek (5 January 1986 – 13 August 2004) was a Czech football player who played for 1. FC Slovácko. He represented his country at under-19 level.

Voříšek made his Gambrinus liga debut on 16 February 2003 in Slovácko's match against Jablonec, going on to make 11 appearances for Slovácko. His only start came against Blšany on 24 May 2003, whereas his other 10 appearances were as a substitute.

Voříšek died in a car accident in the town of Uherský Ostroh in August 2004 at the age of 18.

References

External links
 Profile at iDNES.cz

Czech footballers
Czech First League players
1986 births
2004 deaths
1. FC Slovácko players
Road incident deaths in the Czech Republic

Association football forwards